William Crooks may refer to:
William Crooks (Canadian politician) (1776–1836), businessman and political figure in Upper Canada
William Crooks (locomotive), the first steam locomotive to operate in Minnesota
Will Crooks (1852–1921), Labour member of the British House of Commons
William Crooks (colonel) (1832–1907), American Civil War veteran for the Union

See also
William Crookes, English chemist and physicist
William Crook (disambiguation)